Monrudee Chapookham is a road cyclist from Thailand. She participated at the 2007 UCI Road World Championships, 2009 UCI Road World Championships, 2010 UCI Road World Championships and 2011 UCI Road World Championships.

References

External links
 profile at Procyclingstats.com

1986 births
Monrudee Chapookam
Living people
Place of birth missing (living people)
Date of birth missing (living people)
Cyclists at the 2002 Asian Games
Cyclists at the 2006 Asian Games
Cyclists at the 2010 Asian Games
Southeast Asian Games medalists in cycling
Monrudee Chapookam
Monrudee Chapookam
Competitors at the 2005 Southeast Asian Games
Monrudee Chapookam
Monrudee Chapookam